Still Small Voice is a studio album by guitarist Paul Jackson Jr. released in 2003 on Blue Note Records.The album rose to No. 29 on the Billboard Jazz Albums chart.

Tracklisting

References

2003 albums